This is an index of articles related to Asia. The transcontinental countries spanning Europe are also shown.

 Index of Abkhazia-related articles
 Index of Afghanistan-related articles
 Index of Armenia-related articles
 Index of Azerbaijan-related articles
 Index of Bahrain-related articles
 Index of Bangladesh-related articles
 Index of Bhutan-related articles
 Index of Brunei-related articles
 Index of Burma-related articles
 Index of Cambodia-related articles
 Index of China (PROC)-related articles
 Index of China (ROC)-related articles
 Index of Cyprus-related articles
 Index of East Timor-related articles
 Index of Georgia-related articles
 Index of India-related articles
 Index of Indonesia-related articles
 Index of Iran-related articles
 Index of Iraq-related articles
 Index of Israel-related articles
 Index of Japan-related articles
 Index of Jordan-related articles
 Index of Kazakhstan-related articles
 Index of Kuwait-related articles
 Index of Kyrgyzstan-related articles
 Index of Laos-related articles
 Index of Lebanon-related articles
 Index of Malaysia-related articles
 Index of Maldives-related articles
 Index of Mongolia-related articles
 Index of Nepal-related articles
 Index of Northern Cyprus-related articles
 Index of North Korea–related articles
 Index of Oman-related articles
 Index of Pakistan-related articles
 Index of Palestine-related articles
 Index of Philippines-related articles
 Index of Qatar-related articles
 Index of Russia-related articles
 Index of Saudi Arabia-related articles
 Index of Singapore-related articles
 Index of South Korea–related articles
 Index of South Ossetia-related articles
 Index of Sri Lanka-related articles
 Index of Syria-related articles
 Index of Tajikistan-related articles
 Index of Thailand-related articles
 Index of Turkey-related articles
 Index of Turkmenistan-related articles
 Index of United Arab Emirates-related articles
 Index of Uzbekistan-related articles
 Index of Vietnam-related articles
 Index of Yemen-related articles

See also

Notes

Country related
Asia
.Country related